The 1942 San Francisco Dons football team was an American football team that represented the University of San Francisco as an independent during the 1942 college football season. In their first season under head coach Al Tassi, the Dons compiled a 6–4 record and outscored their opponents by a combined total of 221 to 106.

Schedule

References

San Francisco
San Francisco Dons football seasons
San Francisco Dons football